The 2020–21 Boston Bruins season was the 97th season for the National Hockey League franchise that was established on November 1, 1924. The Bruins entered the season as defending Presidents' Trophy and Atlantic Division champions. On December 20, 2020, the league temporarily realigned into four divisions with no conferences due to the COVID-19 pandemic and the ongoing closure of the Canada–United States border. As a result of this realignment, the Bruins played this season in the East Division, only facing opponents from within the new division in a shortened 56-game regular season, and the first two rounds of the playoffs.

On March 25, spectators were allowed back into the TD Garden with a limited capacity of 2,200. This was the first time fans were in attendance at a Bruins home game since March 7th of the previous year. The capacity at the Garden was increased to 25% on May 10. Starting May 29, the venue was able to host fans at full capacity.

On May 3, the Bruins clinched a playoff berth after a 3–0 win against the New Jersey Devils. In the playoffs, they eliminated the Washington Capitals in the First Round in five games. The Bruins would lose to the New York Islanders in the Second Round in six games.

Standings

Divisional standings

Schedule and results

Regular season
The regular season schedule was published on December 23, 2020.

Playoffs

Draft picks

Below are the Boston Bruins' selections at the 2020 NHL Entry Draft, which was originally scheduled for June 26–27, 2020 at the Bell Center in Montreal, Quebec, but was postponed on March 25, 2020, due to the COVID-19 pandemic. The rescheduled draft was held October 6–7, 2020 virtually via Video conference call from the NHL Network studio in Secaucus, New Jersey.

Notes

References

Boston Bruins seasons
Boston Bruins
Boston Bruins
Boston Bruins
Boston Bruins
Bruins
Bruins